Milotice nad Opavou is a municipality and village in Bruntál District in the Moravian-Silesian Region of the Czech Republic. It has about 400 inhabitants.

History
The first written mention of Milotice nad Opavou is from 1288.

Gallery

References

External links

 

Villages in Bruntál District